Matteo Viola (born 7 July 1987) is an Italian professional tennis player. He competes mainly on the ATP Challenger Tour and ITF Futures, both in singles and doubles. He reached his highest ATP singles ranking, No. 118 on 18 March 2013 and his highest ATP doubles ranking, No. 171 on 24 September 2012.

Challenger and Futures finals

Singles: 34 (17–17)

Doubles: 28 (13–15)

References

External links
 
 

1987 births
Living people
Italian male tennis players